Randvaal is a town in Midvaal Local Municipality in the Gauteng province of South Africa.

References

Populated places in the Midvaal Local Municipality
Populated places established in 1904